George Essex Hampton (c. 1838–1876) was an unpopular public official in colonial Western Australia.

The son of Governor of Western Australia Dr John Hampton, George Hampton arrived in the colony with his father in February 1862 on board the Stathallen.  In 1866 he was holding the offices of private secretary to his father, clerk of council and member of the Finance Board, when he was in addition appointed acting Comptroller General of Convicts.  As Hampton had no particular qualifications for the position, this "unusually blatant act of nepotism"1 was extremely unpopular within the colony.  It was further rumoured that George Hampton received a lodging allowance for the position, an allowance to which he was entitled by regulations but did not need since he lived with his father at Government House.  The Perth Gazette sarcastically commented that Hampton could not apply the money to the purpose for which it was granted "unless His Excellency intends to charge him rent for the rooms he occupies in his residence, in which case, of course, the amount will be placed to the credit of the colonial revenue."2 Both Hamptons became figures of public hostility and ridicule thereafter, especially George.

Under George Hampton, convict discipline became extremely harsh; floggings became commonplace and solitary confinement was reintroduced.  He was hated by most convicts, and in October 1866 a convict named Connor attacked him with a pickaxe at the Fremantle Quarries, and only the swift action of a guard saved him.  As a result of Hampton's harsh convict discipline, escape attempts increased markedly.  When Moondyne Joe effected his famous escape of 7 March 1867, the public in general felt that a good joke had been played on the Governor and his son, and much pleasure was taken in ridiculing them.  A song caught on:

Governor Hampton lobbied for his son to be confirmed in his acting position, but was unsuccessful.  At the conclusion of Governor Hampton's term, George Hampton indicated his willingness to remain in the colony provided he was official appointed Comptroller General.  A week later the appointment of Henry Wakefield was announced, and in November 1868 he accompanied his father in departing the colony on the Emily Smith.

Little is known of Hampton's personal life.  In 1865, Bishop Hale had been openly critical of his "romantic affair with a Mrs Young" 3.  On 13 June 1868, he married Fanny Stone, and she accompanied him back to England.  He died in 1876.

Notes
 de Garis (1981), page 302
 Battye (1924)
 Boyce (1979), page 50.

References

  Republished in 1998 by Hesperian Press.  .

 Republished in 1991 by Fremantle Arts Centre Press.  .

1838 births
1876 deaths
Convictism in Western Australia
Public servants of Western Australia